The Weather System Follow-on Microwave (WSF-M) satellite is the United States Department of Defense's next-generation operational environmental satellite system. WSF-M will be a sun-synchronous Low Earth Orbit (LEO) satellite with a passive microwave imaging radiometer instrument and hosted furnished Energetic Charged Particle (ECP) sensor. The Air Force Space Command intends to include ECP sensors on all future satellites for space weather monitoring, starting from the early 2020s. WSF-M is currently contracted for launch in 2024 on a Falcon 9 Block 5 rocket.

WSF-M will be the first satellite in the Weather System Follow-on (WSF) program. Following the cancellation of the National Polar-orbiting Operational Environmental Satellite System (NPOESS), the Air Force continued the development of a weather satellite under the Defense Weather Satellite System (DWSS) program based on NPOESS. However, when that system faced delays and funding issues, the White House cancelled it and instituted the WSF program.

WSF-M is designed to mitigate three high priority U.S. DoD Space-Based Environmental Monitoring (SBEM) gaps: ocean surface vector winds, tropical cyclone intensity and LEO energetic charged particles.

References 

Weather satellites of the United States
Proposed satellites
2023 in spaceflight
Military satellites of the United States